Aldridge may refer to:

Places
In the United Kingdom
 Aldridge, a town in England
 Aldridge-Brownhills Urban District
 Aldridge-Brownhills (UK Parliament constituency), its representation in the House of Commons 

In the United States
 Aldridge, Alabama
 Aldridge, Montana, a ghost town in Park County, Montana
 Aldridge, Texas, a ghost town in Jasper County, Texas
 Aldridge Botanical Gardens in Hoover, Alabama

People
Aldridge (surname)
Aldridge Bousfield (1941–2020), American mathematician and writer
The Aldridge Sisters, American singing act

Other uses
Aldridge Pryor, a fictional character from the British comic magazine Viz
Aldridge Foundation, an educational charity which sponsors schools in England

See also
Aldridge Hotel (disambiguation), the name of three Hotels in Oklahoma